On Bison is a fight song of North Dakota State University in Fargo, North Dakota.

Lyrics

References

External links
On Bison score
On Bison audio recording

North Dakota State University
American college songs
College fight songs in the United States
Missouri Valley Conference fight songs